The following outline is provided as an overview of and topical guide to the United States Commonwealth of Kentucky:

Kentucky – state located in the East Central United States of America, nicknamed the "Bluegrass State", due to the presence of  bluegrass in many of the pastures throughout the state.  As classified by the United States Census Bureau, Kentucky is a Southern state, in the East South Central region. Kentucky is the 37th largest state in terms of total area, the 36th largest in land area, and ranks 26th in population. Originally a part of Virginia, in 1792 it became the 15th state to join the Union. Kentucky is designated a commonwealth by the Kentucky Constitution and is known as the "Commonwealth of Kentucky."

General reference

 Names
 Common name: Kentucky
 Pronunciation: 
 Official name:  Commonwealth of Kentucky
 Abbreviations and name codes
 Postal symbol:  KY
 ISO 3166-2 code:  US-KY
 Internet second-level domain:  .ky.us
 Nicknames
 Bluegrass State (currently used on license plates)
 Corn-cracker State (reported in 1881)
 The Dark and Bloody Ground State (an allusion to battles between the Creek, Shawnee, Chickasaw, and Cherokee tribes)
Hemp State
 Tobacco State
 Adjectival:  Kentucky
 Demonym:  Kentuckian

Geography of Kentucky

Geography of Kentucky
 Kentucky is: a U.S. state, a federal state of the United States of America
 Location
 Northern hemisphere
 Western hemisphere
 Americas
 North America
 Anglo America
 Northern America
 United States of America
 Contiguous United States
 Central United States
 East South Central States
 Southern United States
 Southeastern United States
 Population of Kentucky: 4,339,367 (2010 U.S. Census)
 Area of Kentucky:
 Atlas of Kentucky

Places in Kentucky

 Historic places in Kentucky
 National Historic Landmarks in Kentucky
 National Register of Historic Places listings in Kentucky
 Bridges on the National Register of Historic Places in Kentucky
 National Natural Landmarks in Kentucky
 National parks in Kentucky
 State parks in Kentucky

Environment of Kentucky

 Climate of Kentucky
 Climate change in Kentucky
 Greenhouse gas emissions in Kentucky
 Protected areas in Kentucky
 State forests of Kentucky
 Superfund sites in Kentucky

Natural geographic features of Kentucky

 Lakes of Kentucky
 Rivers of Kentucky

Regions of Kentucky

 The Bluegrass
 Eastern Kentucky
 Jackson Purchase
 Northern Kentucky
 The Pennyrile
 South Central Kentucky
 Western Coal Fields

Administrative divisions of Kentucky

 The 120 Counties of the Commonwealth of Kentucky
 Municipalities in Kentucky
 Cities in Kentucky
 State capital of Kentucky:
 City nicknames in Kentucky

Demography of Kentucky

Demographics of Kentucky

Government and politics of Kentucky

Politics of Kentucky
 Form of government: U.S. state government
 United States congressional delegations from Kentucky
 Kentucky State Capitol
 Elections in Kentucky
 Electoral reform in Kentucky
 Political party strength in Kentucky

Branches of the government of Kentucky

Government of Kentucky

Executive branch of the government of Kentucky
 Governor of Kentucky
 Lieutenant Governor of Kentucky
 Secretary of State of Kentucky
 State departments
 Kentucky Department of Transportation

Legislative branch of the government of Kentucky

 Kentucky General Assembly (bicameral)
 Upper house: Kentucky Senate
 Lower house: Kentucky House of Representatives

Judicial branch of the government of Kentucky

Courts of Kentucky
 Supreme Court of Kentucky

Law and order in Kentucky

Law of Kentucky
 Crime in Kentucky
 Law enforcement in Kentucky
 Law enforcement agencies in Kentucky
 Kentucky State Police

Laws by type
 Cannabis in Kentucky
 Capital punishment in Kentucky
 Individuals executed in Kentucky
 Constitution of Kentucky
 Gun laws in Kentucky

Military in Kentucky

 Kentucky Air National Guard
 Kentucky Army National Guard

History of Kentucky

History of Kentucky

Historical societies in Kentucky
 The Filson Historical Society

History of Kentucky, by period
 Timeline of Kentucky history
Prehistory of Kentucky
Indigenous peoples
English Colony of Virginia, 1607–1707
French colony of Louisiane, 1699–1764
British Colony of Virginia, 1707–1776
French and Indian War, 1754–1763
Treaty of Fontainebleau of 1762
Treaty of Paris of 1763
British Indian Reserve, 1763–1783
Royal Proclamation of 1763
American Revolutionary War, April 19, 1775 – September 3, 1783
United States Declaration of Independence, July 4, 1776
Siege of Boonesborough, September 7–18, 1778
Treaty of Paris, September 3, 1783
Commonwealth of Virginia, 1776–1792
Cherokee–American wars, 1776–1794
Kentucky County, Virginia, 1776–1780
Separation of Kentucky from Virginia in 1792
Commonwealth of Kentucky becomes 15th State admitted to the United States of America on June 1, 1792
History of slavery in Kentucky
War of 1812, June 18, 1812 – March 23, 1815
Treaty of Ghent, December 24, 1814
Mexican–American War, April 25, 1846 – February 2, 1848
Abraham Lincoln becomes 16th President of the United States on March 4, 1861
American Civil War, April 12, 1861 – May 13, 1865
Kentucky in the American Civil War
Border state, 1861–1865
Battle of Perryville, October 8, 1862
Morgan's Raid, June 11 – July 26, 1863
Mammoth Cave National Park established on July 1, 1941

History of Kentucky, by region
 by city
 History of Lexington, Kentucky
 History of Louisville, Kentucky
 Louisville in the American Civil War
 by county
 Jefferson County, Kentucky#History

History of Kentucky, by subject
 History of slavery in Kentucky
 List of Kentucky women in the civil rights era

Culture of Kentucky

Culture of Kentucky
 Cuisine of Kentucky
 Museums in Kentucky
 Religion in Kentucky
 Episcopal Diocese of Kentucky
 Scouting in Kentucky
 State symbols of Kentucky
 Flag of the Commonwealth of Kentucky 
 Seal of the Commonwealth of Kentucky

The Arts in Kentucky
 Music of Kentucky
 Theater in Kentucky

Sports in Kentucky

Sports in Kentucky

Economy and infrastructure of Kentucky

Economy of Kentucky
 Agriculture in Kentucky
 Communications in Kentucky
 Newspapers in Kentucky
 Radio stations in Kentucky
 Television stations in Kentucky
 Energy in Kentucky
 Coal mining in Kentucky
 Power stations in Kentucky
 Solar power in Kentucky
 Wind power in Kentucky
 Health care in Kentucky
 Hospitals in Kentucky
 Transportation in Kentucky
 Airports in Kentucky
 Roads in Kentucky
 U.S. Highways in Kentucky
 Interstate Highways in Kentucky

Education in Kentucky

Education in Kentucky
 Schools in Kentucky
 School districts in Kentucky
 High schools in Kentucky
 Colleges and universities in Kentucky
 University of Kentucky
 Kentucky State University

See also

Topic overview:
Kentucky

Index of Kentucky-related articles

References

External links

 Kentucky.gov: My New Kentucky Home
 Kentucky State and County Government Websites
 Kentucky State Databases - Annotated list of searchable databases produced by Kentucky state agencies and compiled by the Government Documents Roundtable of the American Library Association.
 
 Kentucky Department of Tourism
 
 The Kentucky Highlands Project
 USGS real-time, geographic, and other scientific resources of Kentucky
 Energy & Environmental Data for Kentucky
 Kentucky State Facts
 Kentucky: Unbridled Spirit
 Kentucky Virtual Library
 "Science In Your Backyard: Kentucky" U.S. Department of the Interior | U.S. Geological Survey, July 3, 2006, retrieved November 4, 2006
 U.S. Census Bureau Kentucky QuickFacts
 

Kentucky
Kentucky